Simon Tüting (born 7 September 1986) is a German former professional footballer who played as a midfielder.

Club career
Tüting was born in Bramsche, Lower Saxony. In 2007, he left VfL Osnabrück for then Bundesliga side Hansa Rostock. For Rostock he made one Bundesliga appearance and another five in the 2. Bundesliga after the club was relegated.

On 8 July 2009, 1. FC Magdeburg announced they had signed Tüting on a one-year contract, and he joined Chemnitz eighteen months later. In early February 2015, he returned to VfL Osnabrück after seven and a half years. He joined the club from 2. Bundesliga side SV Sandhausen and signed a contract until 2017.

References

External links
 
 Simon Tüting Interview

1986 births
Living people
People from Bramsche
Footballers from Lower Saxony
Association football midfielders
German footballers
VfL Osnabrück players
FC Hansa Rostock players
1. FC Magdeburg players
Chemnitzer FC players
SV Sandhausen players
Bundesliga players
2. Bundesliga players
3. Liga players